Julius Hansen (10 July 1896 – 11 March 1989) was a Danish sports shooter. He competed in the 50 m rifle event at the 1936 Summer Olympics.

References

1896 births
1989 deaths
Danish male sport shooters
Olympic shooters of Denmark
Shooters at the 1936 Summer Olympics
Sportspeople from Copenhagen